Lawful Larceny may refer to:
 Lawful Larceny (1930 film), an American pre-Code melodramatic film, based on the play
 Lawful Larceny (1923 film), an American silent drama film, based on the play
 Lawful Larceny (play), a 1922 play by Samuel Shipman